Elminster – The Making of a Mage (1994) is the first book in the Elminster series by Ed Greenwood.

Plot summary
Elminster – The Making of a Mage covers from his first encounter with magic as a young boy, to his days as a rebel fighter, to his nights as a thief, then on to his life following Mystra. It is the first real insight into why Elminster is "Elminster". It starts with an overview of his tragic childhood, on to his even rougher life growing up trying to hide who he is. Then as a thief he sneaks into a closed temple of Mystra to defile it. He is about to set to his task when he is spotted by a mage but then saved by the Lady of mysteries and given a chance to slay the mage that was to slay him. After he debated with the Goddess over whether or not it is right to use magic he let the mage go. Mystra then helps to hide him from those who might want him to be used in their plots, or just kill him, until he has the power to take his revenge.

Publication history
Ed Greenwood wrote Elminster: The Making of a Mage as a hardcover novel in just 16 days, and in 1994 the novel sold out its 75,000 print run between Boxing Day and New Year's Eve.

Reception

Reviews
White Wolf Inphobia #54 (April, 1995)
Backstab #4

References

 

1994 American novels
1994 fantasy novels
Forgotten Realms novels
Novels by Ed Greenwood